Stefan Brasas (born 31 August 1967 in Münster) is a German football coach and former player who played as a goalkeeper.

References

External links
 

Living people
1967 births
Sportspeople from Münster
German footballers
Footballers from North Rhine-Westphalia
Association football goalkeepers
VfL Bochum II players
SV Werder Bremen II players
Stuttgarter Kickers players
1. FC Saarbrücken players
SV Meppen players
SV Werder Bremen players
MSV Duisburg players
AC Omonia players
SpVgg Unterhaching players
Bundesliga players
2. Bundesliga players
Cypriot First Division players
German expatriate footballers
German expatriate sportspeople in Cyprus
Expatriate footballers in Cyprus
West German footballers